Lamo waterfall (Nepali:लामो झरना), also known as Jalbire Jharana, is located in Chandi Vhanjhyang in the section of Muglin-Narayangarh Highway in Chitwan district of Nepal. The fall is about 60 meter high. A cannoying sports is also installed in the fall.

The fall can be accessed by a kilometer long trial from Jalbire Temple which is situated 6 km towards Narayangarh from Mugling.

See also
List of waterfalls of Nepal

References

Waterfalls of Nepal